The Ardamine Estate was a country estate and house  near Gorey, in County Wexford, Ireland. The house was destroyed in an IRA attack on 9 July 1921 and not rebuilt.

The house and estate was acquired by Solomon Richards in 1818 with the proceeds of an 1812 lottery win of £10,000 and inherited by his successors.

See also
 Destruction of Irish country houses (1919–1923)
 Roebuck Estate

References 

Country houses in Ireland
1921 in Ireland